Owen McAuley (born 5 October 1973 in Belfast, Northern Ireland) is a British auto racing driver.

Racing career

He started karting in his native Northern Ireland, becoming national champion three years running from 1988 to 1991.

After his successful karting career he progressed into single seater racing cars

In 1992 he raced in the Northern Ireland Formula Ford Championship, finishing the season in fourth place. In 1993 he won the Formula Vauxhall Lotus Winter Series, This was followed in 1994 by winning the British Formula Vauxhall Lotus title, including four race wins. These prestigious British titles were won driving for Paul Stewart Racing.

Another title came in 1995, winning the International Formula 3 Cup for Silverstone-based Alan Docking Racing.

A year in the British Touring Car Championship in 1996 was followed by moving to America to compete in the Barber Dodge Pro Series where he raced on some famous circuits like Sebring in Florida and Road America in Ohio.

Racing record

Complete British Touring Car Championship results
(key) (Races in bold indicate pole position - 1 point awarded all races) (Races in italics indicate fastest lap)

1973 births
Living people
Racing drivers from Northern Ireland
British Touring Car Championship drivers
Barber Pro Series drivers
Alan Docking Racing drivers
British Formula Three Championship drivers